Nunca el Tiempo es Perdido is the second solo studio album from Spanish musician Manolo García, formerly of the band El Último de la Fila.

Track listing 

"Sin Que Sepas de mi" – 5:16
"Suave, Suave" – 3:58
"Rosa de Alejandria" – 4:35
"Somos Levedad" – 5:00
"Con los Hombres Azules" – 4:50
"Vendran Dias" – 4:49
"Mientras Observo al Afilador" – 6:16
"Nunca el Tiempo es Perdido" – 4:28
"Por Respirar" – 4:43
"Alegre como una Mosca Ante un Pastel de Bodas" – 4:55
"Prendi la Flor" – 3:59
"En los Desiertos Por Habitar" – 3:11
"Alegre como una Mosca Ante un Pastel de Bodas (fragmento) – 0:37
"Un Plan" – 5:04

Certifications

References 

2001 albums